

Events

Pre-1600
3114 BC – The Mesoamerican Long Count calendar, used by several pre-Columbian Mesoamerican civilizations, notably the Maya, begins.
2492 BC – Traditional date of the defeat of Bel by Hayk, progenitor and founder of the Armenian nation.
106 – The south-western part of Dacia (modern Romania) becomes a Roman province: Roman Dacia.
 355 – Claudius Silvanus, accused of treason, proclaims himself Roman Emperor against Constantius II.
 490 – Battle of Adda: The Goths under Theodoric the Great and his ally Alaric II defeat the forces of Odoacer on the Adda River, near Milan.
 923 – The Qarmatians of Bahrayn capture and pillage the city of Basra.
1315 – The Great Famine of Europe becomes so dire that even the king of England has difficulties buying bread for himself and his entourage.
1332 – Wars of Scottish Independence: Battle of Dupplin Moor: Scots under Domhnall II, Earl of Mar are routed by Edward Balliol.
1473 – The Battle of Otlukbeli: Mehmed the Conqueror of the Ottoman Empire decisively defeats Uzun Hassan of Aq Qoyunlu.
1492 – Rodrigo de Borja is elected as Head of the Catholic Church, taking the name Pope Alexander VI.

1601–1900
1675 – Franco-Dutch War: Forces of the Holy Roman Empire defeat the French in the Battle of Konzer Brücke.
1786 – Captain Francis Light establishes the British colony of Penang in Malaysia.
1804 – Francis II assumes the title of first Emperor of Austria.
1812 – Peninsular War: French troops engage British-Portuguese forces in the Battle of Majadahonda.
1813 – In Colombia, Juan del Corral declares the independence of Antioquia.
1858 – The Eiger in the Bernese Alps is ascended for the first time by Charles Barrington accompanied by Christian Almer and Peter Bohren.
1871 – An explosion of guncotton occurs in Stowmarket, England, killing 28.
1898 – Spanish–American War: American troops enter the city of Mayagüez, Puerto Rico.

1901–present
1918 – World War I: The Battle of Amiens ends.
1919 – Germany's Weimar Constitution is signed into law.
1920 – The Latvian–Soviet Peace Treaty, which relinquished Russia's authority and pretenses to Latvia, is signed, ending the Latvian War of Independence.
1929 – Babe Ruth becomes the first baseball player to hit 500 home runs in his career with a home run at League Park in Cleveland, Ohio.
1934 – The first civilian prisoners arrive at the Federal prison on Alcatraz Island.
1942 – Actress Hedy Lamarr and composer George Antheil receive a patent for a Frequency-hopping spread spectrum communication system that later became the basis for modern technologies in wireless telephones, two-way radio communications, and Wi-Fi.
1945 – Poles in Kraków engage in a pogrom against Jews in the city, killing one and wounding five.
1952 – Hussein bin Talal is proclaimed King of Jordan.
1959 – Sheremetyevo International Airport, the second-largest airport in Russia, opens.
1960 – Chad declares independence from France.
1961 – The former Portuguese territories in India of Dadra and Nagar Haveli are merged to create the Union Territory Dadra and Nagar Haveli.
1962 – Vostok 3 launches from the Baikonur Cosmodrome and cosmonaut Andrian Nikolayev becomes the first person to float in microgravity.
1965 – Race riots (the Watts Riots) begin in the Watts area of Los Angeles, California.
1969 – The Apollo 11 astronauts are released from a three-week quarantine following their liftoff from the moon.
1972 – Vietnam War: The last United States ground combat unit leaves South Vietnam.
1975 – East Timor: Governor Mário Lemos Pires of Portuguese Timor abandons the capital Dili, following a coup by the Timorese Democratic Union (UDT) and the outbreak of civil war between UDT and Fretilin.
1979 – Two Aeroflot Tupolev Tu-134s collide over the Ukrainian city of Dniprodzerzhynsk and crash, killing all 178 aboard both airliners.
1982 – A bomb explodes on Pan Am Flight 830, en route from Tokyo, Japan to Honolulu, Hawaii, killing one passenger and injuring 15 others.
1984 – "We begin bombing in five minutes": United States President Ronald Reagan, while running for re-election, jokes while preparing to make his weekly Saturday address on National Public Radio.
1988 – A meeting between Sayyed Imam Al-Sharif, Osama bin Laden, Abdullah Yusuf Azzam, and leaders of Egyptian Islamic Jihad in Afghanistan culminates in the formation of Al-Qaeda.
1992 – The Mall of America in Bloomington, Minnesota opens. At the time the largest shopping mall in the United States.
2000 – An air rage incident occurs on board Southwest Airlines Flight 1763 when 19-year-old Jonathan Burton attempts to storm the cockpit, but he is subdued by other passengers and dies from his injuries.
2003 – NATO takes over command of the peacekeeping force in Afghanistan, marking its first major operation outside Europe in its 54-year-history.
  2003   – Jemaah Islamiyah leader Riduan Isamuddin, better known as Hambali, is arrested in Bangkok, Thailand.
2006 – The oil tanker MT Solar 1 sinks off the coast of Guimaras and Negros Islands in the Philippines, causing the country's worst oil spill.
2012 – At least 306 people are killed and 3,000 others injured in a pair of earthquakes near Tabriz, Iran.
2017 – At least 41 people are killed and another 179 injured after two passenger trains collide in Alexandria, Egypt.

Births

Pre-1600
1086 – Henry V, Holy Roman Emperor (d. 1125)
1384 – Yolande of Aragon (d. 1442)
1472 – Nikolaus von Schönberg, Catholic cardinal (d. 1537)
1510 – Margaret Paleologa, Sovereign Marchioness of Montferrat (d. 1566)

1601–1900
1673 – Richard Mead, English physician and astrologer (d. 1754)
1718 – Frederick Haldimand, Swiss-English general and politician, 22nd Governor of Quebec (d. 1791)
1722 – Richard Brocklesby, English physician (d. 1797)
1748 – Joseph Schuster, German composer (d. 1812)
1778 – Friedrich Ludwig Jahn, Prussian gymnast, educator, and politician (d. 1852)
1794 – James B. Longacre, American engraver (d. 1869)
1807 – David Rice Atchison, American general, lawyer, and politician (d. 1886)
1808 – William W. Chapman, American lawyer and politician (d. 1892)
1816 – Frederick Innes, Scottish-Australian politician, 9th Premier of Tasmania (d. 1882)
1833 – Robert G. Ingersoll, American soldier, lawyer, and politician (d. 1899)
  1833   – Kido Takayoshi, Japanese samurai and politician (d. 1877)
1836 – Warren Brown, American historian and politician (d. 1919)
1837 – Marie François Sadi Carnot, French engineer and politician, 4th President of the French Republic (d. 1894)
1855 – John Hodges, Australian cricketer (d. 1933)
1858 – Christiaan Eijkman, Dutch physician and academic, Nobel Prize laureate (d. 1930)
1860 – Ottó Bláthy, Hungarian engineer and chess player (d. 1939)
1870 – Tom Richardson, English cricketer (d. 1912)
1874 – Princess Louise Charlotte of Saxe-Altenburg (d. 1953)
1877 – Adolph M. Christianson, American lawyer and judge (d. 1954)
1878 – Oliver W. F. Lodge, English poet and author (d. 1955)
1881 – Aleksander Aberg, Estonian wrestler (d. 1920)
1884 – Hermann Wlach, Austrian-Swiss actor (d. 1962)
1885 – Stephen Butterworth, English physicist and engineer (d. 1958)
1891 – Stancho Belkovski, Bulgarian architect and educator (d. 1962)
  1891   – Edgar Zilsel, Austrian historian and philosopher of science, linked to the Vienna Circle (d. 1944)
1892 – Hugh MacDiarmid, Scottish poet and linguist (d. 1978)
  1892   – Eiji Yoshikawa, Japanese author (d. 1962)
1897 – Enid Blyton, English author, poet, and educator (d. 1968)
  1897   – Louise Bogan, American poet and critic (d. 1970)
1898 – Peter Mohr Dam, Faroese educator and politician, 3rd Prime Minister of the Faroe Islands (d. 1968)
1900 – Charley Paddock, American sprinter (d. 1943)
  1900   – Philip Phillips, American archaeologist and scholar (d. 1994)

1901–present
1902 – Alfredo Binda, Italian cyclist (d. 1986)
  1902   – Lloyd Nolan, American actor (d. 1985)
  1902   – Christian de Castries, French general (d. 1991) 
1905 – Erwin Chargaff, Austrian-American biochemist and academic (d. 2002)
  1905   – Ernst Jaakson, Estonian diplomat (d. 1998)
1907 – Ted a'Beckett, Australian cricketer and lawyer (d. 1989)
1908 – Don Freeman, American author and illustrator (d. 1978)
  1908   – Torgny T:son Segerstedt, Swedish sociologist and philosopher (d. 1999)
1909 – Yūji Koseki, Japanese composer (d. 1989)
  1909   – Uku Masing, Estonian philosopher and theologian (d. 1985)
1911 – Thanom Kittikachorn, Thai field marshal and politician, 10th Prime Minister of Thailand (d. 2004)
1912 – Eva Ahnert-Rohlfs, German astronomer and academic (d. 1954)
  1912   – Raphael Blau, American screenwriter and producer (d. 1996)
1913 – Paul Dupuis, Canadian actor (d. 1976)
  1913   – Bob Scheffing, American baseball player and manager (d. 1985)
  1913   – Angus Wilson, English author and academic (d. 1991)
1915 – Morris Weiss, American author and illustrator (d. 2014)
1916 – Johnny Claes, English-Belgian race car driver and trumpet player (d. 1956)
1919 – Luis Olmo, Puerto Rican-American baseball player and manager (d. 2017)
1920 – Mike Douglas, American singer and talk show host (d. 2006)
  1920   – Chuck Rayner, Canadian ice hockey player (d. 2002)
1921 – Alex Haley, American historian and author (d. 1992)
1922 – John "Mule" Miles, American baseball player (d. 2013)
1923 – Stan Chambers, American journalist and actor (d. 2015)
1925 – Floyd Curry, Canadian ice hockey player and manager (d. 2006)
  1925   – Arlene Dahl, American actress, businesswoman and writer (d. 2021) 
1926 – Aaron Klug, Lithuanian-English chemist and biophysicist, Nobel Prize laureate (d. 2018)
1927 – Raymond Leppard, English harpsichord player and conductor (d. 2019)
  1927   – Stuart Rosenberg, American director and producer (d. 2007)
1932 – Fernando Arrabal, Spanish actor, director, and playwright
  1932   – Izzy Asper, Canadian lawyer, businessman, and politician, founded Canwest (d. 2003)
  1932   – Geoffrey Cass, English businessman
  1932   – Peter Eisenman, American architect, designed the City of Culture of Galicia
  1932   – John Gorrie, English director and screenwriter
1933 – Jerry Falwell, American minister and television host (d. 2007)
  1933   – Jerzy Grotowski, Polish director and producer (d. 1999)
  1933   – Tamás Vásáry, Hungarian pianist and conductor
1934 – Bob Hepple, South African lawyer and academic (d. 2015)
1936 – Andre Dubus, American short story writer, essayist, and memoirist (d. 1999)
  1936   – Bill Monbouquette, American baseball player and coach (d. 2015)
  1936   – Jonathan Spence, English-American historian and academic (d. 2021)
1937 – Anna Massey, English actress (d. 2011)
  1937   – Patrick Joseph McGovern, American businessman, founded International Data Group (d. 2014)
1939 – James Mancham, first President of Seychelles (d. 2017)
  1939   – Ronnie Dawson, American singer and guitarist (d. 2003)
1940 – Glenys Page, New Zealand cricketer (d. 2012)
1941 – John Ellison, American-Canadian musician and songwriter 
1942 – Mike Hugg, English drummer and keyboard player 
  1942   – Otis Taylor, American football player (d. 2023)
1943 – Jim Kale, Canadian bass player 
  1943   – Pervez Musharraf, Pakistani general and politician, 10th President of Pakistan (d. 2023)
  1943   – Denis Payton, English saxophonist (d. 2006)
1944 – Martin Linton, Swedish-English journalist and politician
  1944   – Frederick W. Smith, American businessman, founded FedEx
  1944   – Ian McDiarmid, Scottish actor
1946 – John Conlee, American singer-songwriter
  1946   – Marilyn vos Savant, American journalist and author
1947 – Theo de Jong, Dutch footballer, coach, and manager
  1947   – Georgios Karatzaferis, Greek journalist and politician
  1947   – Wilma van den Berg, Dutch sprinter
1948 – Don Boyd, Scottish director, producer, and screenwriter
1949 – Eric Carmen, American singer-songwriter and guitarist 
  1949   – Tim Hutchinson, American lawyer and politician
  1949   – Ian Charleson, Scottish-English actor and singer (d. 1990)
1950 – Erik Brann, American singer-songwriter and guitarist (d. 2003)
  1950   – Gennadiy Nikonov, Russian engineer, designed the AN-94 rifle (d. 2003)
  1950   – Steve Wozniak, American computer scientist and programmer, co-founded Apple Inc.
1952 – Reid Blackburn, American photographer (d. 1980)
  1952   – Bob Mothersbaugh, American singer, guitarist, and producer 
1953 – Hulk Hogan, American wrestler 
  1953   – Wijda Mazereeuw, Dutch swimmer
1954 – Bryan Bassett, American guitarist 
  1954   – Vance Heafner, American golfer and coach (d. 2012)
  1954   – Joe Jackson, English singer-songwriter and musician
  1954   – Tarmo Rüütli, Estonian footballer, coach, and manager
  1954   – Yashpal Sharma, Indian cricketer and umpire (d. 2021)
1955 – Marc Bureau, Canadian politician, 16th Mayor of Gatineau
  1955   – Sylvia Hermon, Northern Irish academic and politician
1956 – Pierre-Louis Lions, French mathematician and academic
1957 – Ian Stuart Donaldson, English singer-songwriter and guitarist (d. 1993)
1957 – Masayoshi Son, Japanese technology entrepreneur and investor
1958 – Steven Pokere, New Zealand rugby player
  1958   – Jah Wobble, English singer-songwriter and bass player 
1959 – Gustavo Cerati, Argentinian singer-songwriter, guitarist, and producer (d. 2014)
  1959   – Yoshiaki Murakami, Japanese businessman
  1959   – Taraki Sivaram, Sri Lankan journalist and author (d. 2005)
  1959   – Richard Scudamore, English businessman
  1959   – László Szlávics, Jr., Hungarian sculptor
1961 – David Brooks, American journalist and author
  1961   – Craig Ehlo, American basketball player and coach
1962 – Brian Azzarello, American author
  1962   – Charles Cecil, English video game designer and co-founded Revolution Software
  1962   – John Micklethwait, English journalist and author
  1962   – Rob Minkoff, American director and producer
1963 – Hiromi Makihara, Japanese baseball player
1964 – Jim Lee, South Korean-American author and illustrator 
  1964   – Grant Waite, New Zealand golfer
1965 – Marc Bergevin, Canadian ice hockey player and manager
  1965   – Embeth Davidtz, American actress
  1965   – Viola Davis, American actress 
1966 – Nigel Martyn, English footballer and coach
  1966   – Juan María Solare, Argentinian pianist and composer
1967 – Massimiliano Allegri, Italian footballer and manager
  1967   – Enrique Bunbury, Spanish singer-songwriter and guitarist 
  1967   – Joe Rogan, American actor, comedian, and television host
  1967   – Petter Wettre, Norwegian saxophonist and composer
1968 – Anna Gunn, American actress
  1968   – Sophie Okonedo, British actress
  1968   – Charlie Sexton, American singer-songwriter and guitarist
1970 – Dirk Hannemann, German footballer and manager
  1970   – Gianluca Pessotto, Italian footballer  
1971 – Alejandra Barros, Mexican actress and screenwriter
  1971   – Tommy Mooney, English footballer
1973 – Kristin Armstrong, American cyclist
1974 – Marie-France Dubreuil, Canadian figure skater
  1974   – Hadiqa Kiani, Pakistani singer, songwriter and philanthropist  
  1974   – Audrey Mestre, French biologist and diver (d. 2002)
  1974   – Carolyn Murphy, American model and actress
1975 – Chris Cummings, Canadian singer-songwriter
1976 – Iván Córdoba, Colombian footballer and manager
  1976   – Bubba Crosby, American baseball player
  1976   – Will Friedle, American actor and screenwriter
  1976   – Ben Gibbard, American singer-songwriter and guitarist 
  1976   – Ľubomír Višňovský, Slovak ice hockey player
1977 – Gemma Hayes, Irish singer-songwriter
  1977   – Dênio Martins, Brazilian footballer
1978 – Spyros Gogolos, Greek footballer
  1978   – Charlotte Leslie, British politician
  1978   – Lillian Nakate, Ugandan politician
  1978   – Isy Suttie, English comedian, musician, actress, and writer
1979 – Walter Ayoví, Ecuadorian footballer
1980 – Daniel Lloyd, English cyclist and sportscaster
  1980   – Lee Suggs, American football player
1981 – Daniel Poohl, Swedish journalist
1983 – Chris Hemsworth, Australian actor
  1983   – Luke Lewis, Australian rugby league player
  1983   – Pavel 183, Russian painter (d. 2013)
1984 – Mojtaba Abedini, Iranian Olympic fencer
  1984   – Melky Cabrera, Dominican baseball player
  1984   – Lucas di Grassi, Brazilian race car driver
1985 – Jacqueline Fernandez, Bahraini–Sri Lankan actress
1986 – Mokhtar Benmoussa, Algerian footballer
  1986   – Pablo Sandoval, Venezuelan baseball player
1987 – Dany N'Guessan, French footballer
  1987   – Drew Storen, American baseball player
1988 – Rabeh Al-Hussaini, Filipino basketball player
  1988   – Patty Mills, Australian basketball player
  1988   – Mustafa Pektemek, Turkish footballer
1989 – Junior Heffernan, Irish cyclist and triathlete (d. 2013)
  1989   – Sebastian Huke, German footballer
1990 – Lenka Juríková, Slovak tennis player
1991 – Cristian Tello, Spanish footballer
1992 – Tomi Lahren, American conservative political commentator
1994 – Storm Sanders, Australian tennis player
  1994   – Anton Cooper, New Zealand cross-country cyclist
  1994   – Joseph Barbato, French footballer
  1994   – Song I-han, South Korean singer
1997 – Sarah Clelland, Scottish footballer
2001 – Moyuka Uchijima, Japanese tennis player

Deaths

Pre-1600
 223 – Jia Xu, Chinese politician and strategist (b. 147)
 353 – Magnentius, Roman usurper (b. 303)
 449 – Archbishop Flavian of Constantinople
 632 – Rusticula, abbess of Arles
 919 – Dhuka al-Rumi, Abbasid governor of Egypt
 979 – Gero, Count of Alsleben
 991 – Byrhtnoth, English soldier (b. 956)
1044 – Sokkate, king of the Pagan dynasty of Burma (b. 1001)
1204 – Guttorm of Norway (b. 1199)
1253 – Clare of Assisi, Italian follower of Francis of Assisi (b. 1194)
1259 – Möngke Khan, Mongolian emperor (b. 1208)
1268 – Agnes of Faucigny, Dame ruler of Faucigny, Countess consort of Savoy 
1332 – Domhnall II, Earl of Mar
  1332   – Robert II Keith, Marischal of Scotland
  1332   – Thomas Randolph, 2nd Earl of Moray
  1332   – Murdoch III, Earl of Menteith
  1332   – Robert Bruce, Lord of Liddesdale
1456 – John Hunyadi, Hungarian general and politician (b. 1387)
1464 – Nicholas of Cusa, German cardinal and mystic (b. 1401)
1465 – Kettil Karlsson, regent of Sweden and Bishop of Linköping (b. 1433)
1486 – William Waynflete, English Lord Chancellor and bishop of Winchester (b. c. 1398)
1494 – Hans Memling, German-Belgian painter (b. 1430)
1519 – Johann Tetzel, German preacher  (b. 1465)
1556 – John Bell, English bishop
1563 – Bartolomé de Escobedo, Spanish composer and educator (b. 1500)
1578 – Pedro Nunes, Portuguese mathematician and academic (b. 1502)
1596 – Hamnet Shakespeare, son of William Shakespeare (b. 1585)

1601–1900
1614 – Lavinia Fontana, Italian painter (b. 1552)
1656 – Ottavio Piccolomini, Austrian-Italian field marshal (b. 1599)
1725 – Prince Vittorio Amedeo Theodore of Savoy (b. 1723)
1774 – Charles-François Tiphaigne de la Roche, French physician and author (b. 1722)
1813 – Henry James Pye, English poet and politician (b. 1745)
1851 – Lorenz Oken, German botanist, biologist, and ornithologist (b. 1779)
1854 – Macedonio Melloni, Italian physicist and academic (b. 1798)
1868 – Halfdan Kjerulf, Norwegian pianist and composer (b. 1815)
1886 – Lydia Koidula, Estonian poet and playwright (b. 1843)
1890 – John Henry Newman, English cardinal and theologian (b. 1801)
1892 – Enrico Betti, Italian mathematician and academic (b. 1813)

1901–present
1903 – Eugenio María de Hostos, Puerto Rican-American  sociologist, philosopher, and lawyer (b. 1839)
1908 – Khudiram Bose, Indian Bengali revolutionary (b. 1889)
1919 – Andrew Carnegie, Scottish-American businessman and philanthropist, founded the Carnegie Steel Company and Carnegie Hall (b. 1835)
1921 – Mary Sumner, English philanthropist, founded the Mothers' Union (b. 1828)
1936 – Blas Infante, Spanish historian and politician (b. 1885)
1937 – Edith Wharton, American novelist and short story writer (b. 1862)
1939 – Jean Bugatti, German-Italian engineer (b. 1909)
  1939   – Siegfried Flesch, Austrian fencer (b. 1872)
1945 – Stefan Jaracz, Polish actor and theater producer (b. 1883) 
1953 – Tazio Nuvolari, Italian race car driver and motorcycle racer (b. 1892)
1956 – Jackson Pollock, American painter (b. 1912)
1961 – Antanas Škėma, Lithuanian-American author, playwright, actor, and director (b. 1910)
1963 – Otto Wahle, Austrian-American swimmer and coach (b. 1879)
1965 – Bill Woodfull, Australian cricketer and educator (b. 1897)
1969 – Miriam Licette, English soprano and educator (b. 1885)
1972 – Max Theiler, South African-American virologist and academic, Nobel Prize laureate (b. 1899)
1974 – Vicente Emilio Sojo, Venezuelan conductor and composer (b. 1887)
1977 – Frederic Calland Williams, British co-inventor of the Williams-Kilborn tube, used for memory in early computer systems (b. 1911)
1978 – Berta Ruck, Indian-born Welsh romance novelist (b. 1878)
1979 – J. G. Farrell, English author (b. 1935)
1980 – Paul Robert, French lexicographer and publisher (b. 1910)
1982 – Tom Drake, American actor and singer (b. 1918)
1984 – Alfred A. Knopf Sr., American publisher, founded Alfred A. Knopf, Inc. (b. 1892)
  1984   – Paul Felix Schmidt, Estonian–American chemist and chess player (b. 1916)
1986 – János Drapál, Hungarian motorcycle racer (b. 1948)
1988 – Anne Ramsey, American actress (b. 1929)
1989 – John Meillon, Australian actor (b. 1934)
1991 – J. D. McDuffie, American race car driver (b. 1938)
1994 – Peter Cushing, English actor (b. 1913)
1995 – Phil Harris, American singer-songwriter and actor (b. 1904)
1996 – Rafael Kubelík, Czech conductor and composer (b. 1914)
  1996   – Ambrosio Padilla, Filipino basketball player and politician (b. 1910)
2000 – Jean Papineau-Couture, Canadian composer and academic (b. 1916)
2001 – Percy Stallard, English cyclist and coach (b. 1909)
2002 – Galen Rowell, American photographer and mountaineer (b. 1940)
2003 – Armand Borel, Swiss-American mathematician and academic (b. 1923)
  2003   – Herb Brooks, American ice hockey player and coach (b. 1937)
2006 – Mike Douglas, American singer and talk show host (b. 1920)
2008 – George Furth, American actor and playwright (b. 1932)
  2008   – Dursun Karataş, founding leader of the Revolutionary People's Liberation Party–Front (DHKP-C) in Turkey (b. 1952)
2009 – Eunice Kennedy Shriver, American activist, founded the Special Olympics  (b. 1921)
2012 – Red Bastien, American wrestler, trainer, and promoter (b. 1931)
  2012   – Michael Dokes, American boxer (b. 1958)
  2012   – Lucy Gallardo, Argentinian-Mexican actress and screenwriter (b. 1929)
2013 – Raymond Delisle, French cyclist (b. 1943)
  2013   – Zafar Futehally, Indian ornithologist and author (b. 1919)
  2013   – David Howard, English ballet dancer and educator (b. 1937)
2014 – Vladimir Beara, Croatian footballer and manager (b. 1928)
  2014   – Raymond Gravel, Canadian priest and politician (b. 1952)
  2014   – Kika Szaszkiewiczowa, Polish author and blogger (b. 1917)
  2014   – Robin Williams, American actor and comedian (b. 1951)
2015 – Serge Collot, French viola player and educator (b. 1923)
  2015   – Harald Nielsen, Danish footballer and manager (b. 1941)
  2015   – Richard Oriani, Salvadoran-American metallurgist and engineer (b. 1920)
2017 – Yisrael Kristal, Polish-Israeli supercentenarian;  oldest living Holocaust survivor and one of the ten oldest men ever (b. 1903)
  2017   – Segun Bucknor, Nigerian musician and journalist (b. 1946)
2018 – V S Naipaul, British writer, Nobel Prize laureate (b. 1932)
2019 – Sergio Obeso Rivera, Mexican Roman Catholic cardinal (b. 1931)
2020 – Trini Lopez, Mexican American singer and guitarist (b. 1937)
  2020   – Sumner Redstone, American billionaire businessman (b. 1923)
2022 – Anne Heche, American actress (b. 1969)

Holidays and observances
 Christian Feast Day:
 Athracht
 Clare of Assisi
 Fiacre
 Gaugericus
 John Henry Newman (Church of England)
 Philomena
 Susanna
 Taurinus of Évreux
 Tiburtius and Chromatius
 August 11 (Eastern Orthodox liturgics)
 Flag Day (Pakistan)
 Independence Day, celebrates the independence of Chad from France in 1960.
 Mountain Day (Japan)

References

External links

 
 
 

Days of the year
August